Dietrich in Rio is a live album by Marlene Dietrich, issued on Columbia Records LP, catalogue number WS 316, and reissued on CD by Sony Music Special Products. Though marketed as a "live" album, it likely consists of studio recordings done in New York, overdubbed with applause recorded on tour to create live atmosphere. Four tracks of this album can be heard without the "live" atmosphere on 1991's CD: The Marlene Dietrich Album.

Background and production
From the early 1950s until the mid-1970s, Dietrich worked almost exclusively as a cabaret artist, performing live in large theatres in major cities worldwide. On July 24, 1959, Marlene Dietrich, disembarked from a Varig plane in Rio de Janeiro for a short season concerts there and in São Paulo, she was accompanied by pianist Burt Bacharach with whom she performed in highly successful recitals. Many artists and renowned people were waiting for the artist at the airport of Galeão, one of them was Marshal Teixeira Lott then Minister of War of the Juscelino Kubitschek government. Dates of the tour include Copacabana Palace Hotel (from July 27 to August 2, 1959 (except day 1)) and at the Teatro Record (São Paulo) (from 4 to 9 August). According to Billboard Magazine, Columbia Records taped Marlene Dietrich's night club act at the Copacabana in Rio de Janeiro in July, 1959. This was the only time Dietrich would do shows in the country, new shows were scheduled in the 1970s but had to be canceled at the request of the artist for personal reasons.

Critical reception

The album received mixed to favorable reviews from music critics. 

AllMusic website gave the album two out of five stars and pointed out that the album "finds Dietrich in a sly, almost silly mood, singing with lusty humor and coy flirtatiousness" and that "Dietrich's voice is huskier than it was in her heyday, but this suits the material, which has been rearranged to fit her new lower register, very well". 

Billboard magazine includes the album in their list of "Strongest sales potential of all albums reviewed this week" and wrotes that Dietrich "has never sound better" and praised the cover and the artwork of the album.

Track listing

See also
 Marlene Dietrich discography

References

1959 live albums
Marlene Dietrich albums
Columbia Records live albums
Live traditional pop albums